ThriftBooks is a large web-based used bookseller headquartered near Seattle, Washington. ThriftBooks sells used books, DVDs, CDs, VHS tapes, video games, and audio cassettes. ThriftBooks' business model "is based on achieving economies of scale through automation."

History and platform structure
Selling over 165 million books since its inception in 2003, ThriftBooks is considered one of the largest sellers of used books in the United States and has seven warehouses across the United States. ThriftBooks was founded in the summer of 2003 by Daryl Butcher and Jason Meyer. The two created software that organizes and lists thousands of book titles per day. Since 2004, it has partnered with libraries, which provide unsorted books and get a share of the profits. The first library systems to join were King County, Pierce County, and North Central.

Thriftbooks is popular among book collectors—particularly with those shoppers choosing to avoid Amazon—for being one of few western online bookselling platforms that is not a subsidiary of Amazon. However, Thriftbooks does sell books on Amazon, as well other book resellers such as eBay and AbeBooks.The platform is also popular for its free shipping with a $15 minimum order (formerly $10 but raised to $15 as of January 2022). However, free shipping does not apply to international orders as of 2021. Books do not ship from any ThriftBooks warehouse during U.S. Federal Holidays. Books listed as "New" cannot be delivered to countries outside the United States, although used books, VHS tapes, DVD videos, coloring books, and books categorized as "Collectible" can be. For each book purchased, customers build up points in their accounts which can be put towards a free book through the company's Reading Rewards program.  

ThriftBooks opened a  processing center in Phoenix in 2021 that created 150 new jobs.

See also

List of online booksellers

References

External links

Bookstores of the United States
Book selling websites
Auburn, Washington
Companies based in King County, Washington
Online retailers of the United States
Retail companies established in 2003
2003 establishments in Washington (state)
Online bookstores